The 36th Academy Awards, honoring the best in film for 1963, were held on April 13, 1964, hosted by Jack Lemmon at the Santa Monica Civic Auditorium in Santa Monica, California.

Best Picture winner Tom Jones is the only film to date to receive three Best Supporting Actress nominations; it also tied the Oscar record of five unsuccessful acting nominations, set by Peyton Place at the 30th Academy Awards.

Patricia Neal controversially won Best Actress for her role in Hud, despite having a relatively small amount of screen time. Melvyn Douglas won Best Supporting Actor for the same film, making it the second and, to date, last film to win two acting awards without being nominated for Best Picture (the other being The Miracle Worker the previous year).

At age 71, Margaret Rutherford set a then-record as the oldest winner for Best Supporting Actress, a year after Patty Duke set a then-record as the youngest winner. Rutherford was also only the second Oscar winner over the age of 70 (the other was Edmund Gwenn), as well as the last person born in the 19th century to win an acting Oscar. This was the only year in Academy history that all Best Supporting Actress nominees were born outside the United States.

Sidney Poitier became the first African American actor to win Best Actor, while An Occurrence at Owl Creek Bridge was the first Oscar-winning film to have aired on network television prior to the ceremony. Best Sound Effects was introduced this year, with It's a Mad, Mad, Mad, Mad World winning the award.

Awards

Nominations announced on February 24, 1964. Winners are listed first and highlighted with boldface.

Irving G. Thalberg Memorial Award
Sam Spiegel

Presenters and performers

Presenters
Julie Andrews (Presenter: Best Foreign Language Film)
Anne Bancroft (Presenter: Best Actor)
Anne Baxter and Fred MacMurray (Presenter: Art Direction Awards)
Ed Begley (Presenter: Best Supporting Actress)
Rita Hayworth (Presenter: Best Director)
Sammy Davis Jr. (Presenter: Music Awards)
Angie Dickinson (Presenter: Best Special Effects)
Patty Duke (Presenter: Best Supporting Actor)
Shirley Jones (Presenter: Best Song)
Shirley MacLaine (Presenter: Short Subjects Awards)
Steve McQueen (Presenter: Sound Awards)
Gregory Peck (Presenter: Best Actress)
Sidney Poitier (Presenter: Best Film Editing)
Donna Reed (Presenter: Costume Design Awards)
Debbie Reynolds (Presenter: Documentary Awards)
Edward G. Robinson (Presenter: Writing Awards)
Frank Sinatra (Presenter: Best Picture)
James Stewart (Presenter: Cinematography Awards)
Tuesday Weld (Presenter: Best Sound Effects)

Performers
James Darren ("It's a Mad, Mad, Mad, Mad World" from It's a Mad, Mad, Mad, Mad World)
Harve Presnell ("So Little Time" from 55 Days at Peking)
Katyna Ranieri ("More" from Mondo Cane)
Andy Williams ("Call Me Irresponsible" from Papa's Delicate Condition and "Charade" from Charade)

Multiple nominations and awards

These films had multiple nominations:

10 nominations: Tom Jones
9 nominations: Cleopatra
8 nominations: How the West Was Won
7 nominations: Hud
6 nominations: The Cardinal and It's a Mad, Mad, Mad, Mad World
5 nominations: 8½, Lilies of the Field and Love with the Proper Stranger
4 nominations: America America
3 nominations: Captain Newman, M.D., Irma la Douce and  Sundays and Cybele
2 nominations: 55 Days at Peking, Bye Bye Birdie, A New Kind of Love, This Sporting Life and Twilight of Honor

The following films received multiple awards.

4 wins: Cleopatra and Tom Jones
3 wins: How the West Was Won and Hud
2 wins: 8½

Sidney Poitier winning Best Actor
Sidney Poitier's Best Actor win for Lilies of the Field marked the first time a Black man won a competitive Oscar.  This came five years after his first nomination for Best Actor in 1958's The Defiant Ones.

It would take almost forty years for another African-American male to win Best Actor, when Denzel Washington won in 2001 for Training Day.

Sammy Davis Jr. envelope error
Sammy Davis, Jr. was accidentally given the wrong winner's envelope when he was supposed to announce the award for Best Music Score for an Adaptation or Treatment, instead announcing the winner for Best Music Score - Substantially Original: John Addison for Tom Jones. After a confused round of applause followed by silence, Davis acknowledged his mistake (joking, "Wait 'til the NAACP hears about this!"), and, having been given the right envelope, read the actual winner: Andre Previn for Irma la Douce.

Davis, Jr. then presented Best Music Score - Substantially Original, sarcastically asking "Guess who the winner is?" after reading all the nominees.

See also
21st Golden Globe Awards
1963 in film
 6th Grammy Awards
 15th Primetime Emmy Awards
 16th Primetime Emmy Awards
 17th British Academy Film Awards
 18th Tony Awards
 List of submissions to the 36th Academy Awards for Best Foreign Language Film

References

Academy Awards ceremonies
1963 film awards
1963 awards in the United States
1964 in California
1964 in American cinema
April 1964 events in the United States
Events in Santa Monica, California
20th century in Santa Monica, California